Pir Ali (also written as Pirali) is a holy person in the Yazidi religion. The Çelka Yazidis celebrate the Batizmi festival in his honor.

Pir Ali is also considered to be the incarnation of Melek Taus (Tawusî Melek).

According to Yazidi tradition, Pir Ali came to the Yazidi villages of Tur Abdin and performed miracles there. He is said to have brought a cow that had already been slaughtered and cut into seven parts back to life and thus convinced the Yazidis of his abilities.

References 

Yazidi holy figures